Barbaro (Italian) or Bárbaro (Spanish) means ‘barbarian’. It may refer to:

Geography
 Mount Barbaro

People
 Barbaro 'ndrina a criminal organization in southern Italy

Family name
 Barbaro (surname)
 Barbaro family, a prominent family in the Republic of Venice
 Palazzi Barbaro, a historic building in Venice
 Villa Barbaro, a historic building in Maser, Italy

Turkish admiral, Barbarossa
Barbaros Hayreddin Pasha Turkish admiral
Gölcük Barbaros Hayrettin Lisesi, a Turkish high school
Barbaros class frigate, a class of Turkish warships

First name
 Barbaros Barut, association football player
 Bárbaro Cañizares Major League Baseball player
 Bárbaro Garbey, former Major League Baseball player

Horse racing
 Barbaro (horse), a racehorse that won the Kentucky Derby
 Barbaro Stakes at Delaware Park
 Barbaro Stakes at Pimlico Race Course

Music
 Allegro barbaro (Bartók) a piano piece by Béla Bartók
 Doces Bárbaros, a Brazilian musical group.
"Barbaro", track by Jim Hall from Hemispheres 2008